Johannes Fröhlinger (born 9 June 1985 in Gerolstein, Rhineland-Palatinate) is a German former professional road bicycle racer, who competed professionally between 2007 and 2019 for the ,  and  squads.

Major results

2006
 1st  Overall Tour Alsace
 1st Trophée des Champions
 6th Overall Mainfranken-Tour
 6th Overall 3-Länder-Tour
2008
 9th GP Triberg-Schwarzwald
2009
 3rd GP Triberg-Schwarzwald
 5th Memorial Cimurri
2010
 7th Japan Cup
 10th Trofeo Inca
2011
 6th Overall Bayern–Rundfahrt

Grand Tour general classification results timeline

References

External links 

 

1985 births
Living people
People from Gerolstein
German male cyclists
Cyclists from Rhineland-Palatinate